Newbold School is a private fee-paying primary school in Binfield, near Bracknell, Berkshire. The School is owned and operated by the Seventh-day Adventist Church next to Newbold Seventh-day Adventist Church and Newbold College of Higher Education. The School originally educated students up to the age of 16, pupils over 11 years of age were phased out in the 1970s.

The School educates students from ages 3–11: Early Years, or Reception/Nursery: ages 3–4; Key Stage 1: Years 1–2, ages 5–7; and Key Stage 2: Years 3–6, ages 8–11.

Education and Faith
Academically, the school is known particularly for music and drama, and the curriculum also includes humanities, science, physical education, religious education, art, maths, English, and computing.

History
The school was founded in September 1941 at Newbold Revel near Rugby in Warwickshire. The headteacher was A.J Raitt and there was one teacher at that time - Vera Hardiman. The school was opened to serve the children of students attending Newbold College of Higher Education, (which was a seminary university for the Seventh-day Adventist Church, also then located in Newbold Revel).

Some months after the war ended (December 1945 - January 1946), the School and College moved to Binfield in Berkshire. The School was originally housed on the College campus, which at the time offered a teaching degree and the opportunity for students to carry out their teaching practice in the School. In 1963, the School moved to its current site next to Newbold Seventh-day Adventist Church (then Binfield Seventh-day Adventist Church) on Popeswood Road in Binfield.

Additions to the school were proposed in 2018.

Headteachers of Newbold School
2002 - 2008  Maurice Brooks
2008 - 2009  Vicky Chilvers
2009 - 2011  Pat Eastwood
2011 - 2014  Ruth Ohman
2014–Present Jacqueline Crissey

References

External links
 Official website
 DoE webpage

Private schools in Bracknell Forest
Preparatory schools in Berkshire
Educational institutions established in 1945
Secondary schools affiliated with the Seventh-day Adventist Church
1945 establishments in England
Christian schools in England